The Carter House, at 110 Morgan St. in Versailles, Kentucky, was built in 1792.  It was listed on the National Register of Historic Places in 1975.

It is a two-story brick L-shaped house built in the first year or so from when the town was platted.  Its front section was built before 1816.

The listing included one contributing buildings and one contributing structures.

References

National Register of Historic Places in Woodford County, Kentucky
Houses completed in 1792
Houses in Woodford County, Kentucky
1792 establishments in Kentucky
Houses on the National Register of Historic Places in Kentucky
Versailles, Kentucky